Trenton–Mercer Airport  is a county-owned, joint civil–military, public airport located four miles northwest of Trenton in the West Trenton section of Ewing Township, Mercer County, New Jersey. Formerly known as Mercer County Airport, the airport serves one scheduled airline plus general and corporate aviation. The U.S. Department of Transportation reports that approximately 201,000 passengers departed and 200,000 arrived at the airport in the 12 months ending October 2021, for a total of 401,000 passengers.

With an average of 308 aircraft operation per day, Trenton–Mercer is the third-busiest airport in New Jersey after Newark's 1228 per day and Teterboro's 477 per day. As of May 2018, Trenton was the fifth fastest growing airport in the US.

It is included in the Federal Aviation Administration (FAA) National Plan of Integrated Airport Systems for 2019–2023, in which it is categorized as a non-hub primary commercial service facility.

History

The first airplane landed at what is now Trenton–Mercer Airport in 1907, in what was then Alfred Reeder's farm field, just off of Bear Tavern Road in Ewing. Twenty-two years later in 1929 Skillman Airport opened to the public.

During World War II, the nearby General Motors Inland Fisher Guide Plant ceased producing civilian vehicles and began making Grumman TBF Avenger carrier-based torpedo bombers for the United States Navy. Skillman Airport expanded to accommodate test flights of this aircraft, and after the airport returned to county control following the end of the war it was renamed Mercer County Airport. After the war, the navy reestablished a presence with the construction of Naval Air Warfare Center Trenton adjacent to the airport, which remained open until 1997.

The airport's Air Traffic Control operations were based in the control tower and operate between 6AM and midnight during the 1980s and early 1990s. Since January 1994, tower operations have been shortened to 6AM and 10PM.

In 1994, as a cost-cutting measure, the Mercer County Airport Police and Fire Department was disbanded and replaced by the Mercer County Sheriff's Office (police) and ProTec Fire Services (Aircraft Fire Rescue).

In 1995, the airport's name was changed to Trenton–Mercer Airport in an effort to identify it with the city of Trenton (the capital of New Jersey and county seat of Mercer County).

On March 11, 1998, an NWS/FAA automated surface observing system (ASOS) became operational at the airport, replacing the human weather observers that had previously reported weather conditions.

For many years, the county has planned to replace the outdated terminal at the airport. These plans have been opposed by residents along the flight path living in Ewing, Lawrence, Hopewell, and Pennington.  Opposition has also been expressed in Pennsylvania among residents living along the flight path in Yardley and Lower Makefield.

Ground transportation

Mercer County has a variety of taxi cab companies that operate from the Trenton Transit Center, which services the Northeast Corridor via Amtrak, New Jersey Transit and SEPTA railroads.

NJ Transit Route 608 bus stops on Sam Weinroth Road near the terminal for travel to SEPTA'S West Trenton station for connections to SEPTA's West Trenton Line to Center City Philadelphia, Trenton Transit Center for connections to Amtrak, NJ Transit's Northeast Corridor Line to Newark/New York, River Line to Camden, SEPTA's Trenton Line to Center City Philadelphia, other NJ Transit bus routes to points in Mercer County, South Jersey, and Philadelphia, and SEPTA Suburban Bus Route 127 to Oxford Valley Mall in Langhorne, PA,  and Hamilton station for connections to NJ Transit's Northeast Corridor Line to Newark/New York. Fare is $1.60 one way for adults, and operates daily.

Facilities and aircraft

Trenton–Mercer Airport covers 1,345 acres (544 ha) at an elevation of 212 feet (65 m) above mean sea level. It has two asphalt runways: 6/24 is 6,006 by 150 feet (1,831 x 46 m) and 16/34 is 4,800 by 150 feet (1,463 x 46 m). The airport has three helipads, H1, H2, and H3, each 64 by 64 feet (20 x 20 m). To meet FAA requirements that certain runways be equipped with an EMAS bed before the end of 2013, the airport installed EMAS beds at both ends of runway 16/34 in 2012; officials announced plans in early 2013 to close runway 6/24 for two months that fall to install an EMAS bed at both ends.

For the 12-month period ending April 2, 2019, the airport had 112,513 aircraft operations, an average of 308 per day: 92% general aviation, 4% commercial, 4% air taxi, and <1% military. In May 2020, there were 153 aircraft based at this airport: 86 single-engine, 21 multi-engine, 29 jet, and 17 helicopter.

Trenton–Mercer Airport is home to multiple flight schools including Infinity Flight Group, Mercer County Community College, and an ATP Flight School location.

Military facilities and aircraft
The airport is home to Army Aviation Support Facility #2 and the 1st Battalion, 150th Aviation Regiment, otherwise known as the 1-150th General Support Aviation Battalion of the New Jersey Army National Guard. Equipped with UH-60 Blackhawk helicopters, the battalion provides ground force commanders of the 42nd Infantry Division (Mechanized) with additional air assault, transportation, re-supply, and command and control assets. In its state role under Title 32 United States Code, the unit also provides emergency logistical support in response to disasters or any other emergency support as may be directed by the Governor of New Jersey.

The airport is also home to the Twin Pine Composite Squadron (NER-NJ-092) of the New Jersey Wing of the Civil Air Patrol.

Terminal and future developments
Trenton–Mercer Airport has one terminal with four gates. Gate 2 is divided into 3 sub-gates labeled Gates 2–4. On the upper level of the terminal (before security) is an observation lounge as well as a restaurant, Sky Lounge at Ewing, serving pub food. Sky Lounge has another location past security near Gate 1 that serves drinks and pre-packaged sandwiches and wraps. Parking is $2 per hour and $8 per day.

On November 8, 2013, Mercer County opened a renovated terminal, including a new modular trailer baggage claim outside the terminal, restrooms in the gate area (there were previously no restrooms past security), and—in the area originally occupied by the baggage claim—additional passenger seating and a new gate.

In August 2014, the airport was awarded $2.2 million to rehabilitate 3 taxiways. A spokesperson for the county said that this was the first phase of a three-year plan to make further improvements.

In a study commissioned by the county released in 2013, a new passenger terminal, a corporate office park, medical offices and laboratories, and commercial space would be part of a plan to develop available land at the airport. On September 29, 2016, Mercer County in conjunction with firms Urban Engineers and McFarland Johnson held a public meeting at the nearby West Trenton Ballroom meeting hall. Several aspects of the proposed master plan for the airport were revealed. Plans call for a new terminal sized at 115,000–125,000 square feet. The current terminal is 24,780 square feet. The rental car area will house up to five rental car agencies and with concession, restrooms and gate area expanding to four times the current area.

In 2021, Mercer County released a draft environmental assessment for public comment revealing the final plans for the terminal which will be 125,000 square feet and includes a 1,000-space four-level parking garage which would bring available parking to approximately 2900 spaces.

In March 2022, the FAA issued its approval for the project. The estimated completion date of the terminal and parking garage is mid-to-late 2024

Airline and destinations

Statistics

Top destinations

Carrier shares

Former scheduled airline service

 Allegheny McDonnell Douglas DC-9-30s nonstop to Chicago O'Hare Airport in 1977 were probably Trenton's first jet flights. According to the Official Airline Guide (OAG), the only airline serving Trenton in 1976 was Allegheny Commuter operating small Nord 262 commuter turboprops with nonstops from Newark Airport and Philadelphia as well as  direct one stop flights from Washington National Airport with all service operated on behalf of Allegheny on a code sharing basis.
 United flew mainline jet service with Boeing 727-200s and Boeing 737-200s to Trenton direct from Chicago O'Hare Airport in 1984–86.
 According to the Official Airline Guide (OAG), by late 1989 USAir Express was the only airline serving Trenton with flights operated with small British Aerospace BAe Jetstream 31 commuter propjets nonstop from both Baltimore and Washington Reagan National Airport flown via a code sharing agreement with USAir.
 In the mid to late 1990s Eastwind Airlines operated a hub out of Trenton to Florida and North Carolina as well as airports in Massachusetts, New York and Pennsylvania. The airline also flew from Philadelphia for a short time. This was one of the few instances where Trenton–Mercer saw scheduled jet service from its short runways with Boeing 737-200 and 737-700 aircraft although other airlines operated jet service as well.
 From 1998 until 2003 Shuttle America operated a scheduled business commuter service to airports in Connecticut, Massachusetts, New York, Delaware, and North Carolina. The airline flew 50 seat de Havilland Canada Dash 8-311 turboprops and had all its aircraft stocked with in-flight service items when stopping in Trenton. The airline ceased operations at TTN after a codeshare service with US Airways drew customers to nearby Philadelphia from Trenton.
 In 2006 and 2007 Comair flew to Atlanta and Boston from Trenton as Delta Connection using Canadair CRJ-200 regional jet aircraft. After a few months Big Sky Airlines took over the Boston service with Beechcraft 1900 commuter propjets. The service ended in early January 2008.
 From May 2000 until February 2008 Boston-Maine Airways operated the Pan Am Clipper Connection between Trenton–Mercer Airport and Hanscom Field in Bedford, Massachusetts. The flight was terminated when Boston-Maine Airways ceased operating on February 28, 2008.
 On April 4, 2011, Streamline Airlines re-commenced the former Pan-Am Clipper Connection route between Bedford–Hanscom and Trenton using an Embraer EMB-120 Brasilia turboprop. The carrier was consistently losing money and shut down on September 14, 2012, citing a poor economic climate and unprofitable operations.
 On April 29, 2018, Allegiant Air ended all-jet service from and to Trenton–Mercer Airport, leaving Frontier as the only commercial tenant.

Footnotes

Notes

References

External links

 Trenton–Mercer Airport at Mercer County website
 SkyLounge at Ewing Official site including menu of exclusive food outlet of Trenton Mercer Airport
 Trenton–Mercer Airport (TTN) at New Jersey DOT Airport Directory
 Aerial image as of April 1999 from USGS The National Map
 
 

1929 establishments in New Jersey
Airports established in 1929
Airports in New Jersey
Ewing Township, New Jersey
Transportation buildings and structures in Mercer County, New Jersey